The 2016 Rafael Nadal tennis season officially began on 4 January 2016 with the start of the 2016 Qatar Open.

Year in detail

Australian Open Series

Qatar Open
Nadal began his year at the Qatar Open. He faced compatriot Pablo Carreño Busta in the first round  and managed a comeback by defeating him in three sets. He then defeated Robin Haase in straight sets but then required three sets to defeat Andrey Kuznetsov in the quarter-finals. Nadal then defeated Illya Marchenko in the semifinals in straight sets to advance to the final, where he faced Novak Djokovic for the title. Nadal was crushed, winning just three games in a straight sets defeat, and thus lost his lead in his head-to-head record against Djokovic for the first time.

Australian Open
Nadal suffered a shocking defeat in the first round of the 2016 Australian Open at the hands of his compatriot Fernando Verdasco in five gruelling sets. This marked only the second time in his entire professional career that he has lost in the first round of a grand slam singles tournament. The only other first round loss was to Steve Darcis at the 2013 Wimbledon Championships.

South American Clay Court Season

Argentina Open
After receiving a bye in the first round, Nadal reached the semifinals of the Argentina Open by defeating Juan Mónaco and Paolo Lorenzi respectively in straight sets. However, he lost to an in-form young-gun Dominic Thiem in the semifinals in three sets after squandering 2 match points.

Rio Open
Nadal opens his Rio Open campaign by defeating compatriots Pablo Carreno Busta and Nicolas Almagro respectively in straight sets to book his place in the quarterfinals. He got a walkthrough to the semifinals after Alexandr Dolgopolov withdrew due to a right-shoulder injury. He eventually lost to Pablo Cuevas in the semifinals.

March Masters

Indian Wells Masters
After receiving a bye in the first round, Nadal recorded his first win after changing back to his old racket against Gilles Müller in three tight sets and booked his place in the fourth round winning his rematch against Fernando Verdasco in straight sets. Nadal reaches the quarterfinals for the second straight year after saving a match point against rising star Alexander Zverev to beat him in three gruelling-sets. He defeated Kei Nishikori in straight sets for his first top 10 win of the season to advance to the semifinals. He lost to Novak Djokovic 7–6, 6–2 in the semifinal after squandering a set point on Djokovic's serve in the first set making their head-to-head record 25–23 in Djokovic's favor.

Miami Masters
After a bye in the first round, Nadal lost to Damir Džumhur in the second round, retiring in the third set of their match citing dizziness due to the extreme heat at the end of the first set.

European Clay Court Season

Monte-Carlo Masters

After receiving a bye in the first round, Nadal defeated Aljaz Bedene in straight sets and faced a more stringent test in the third round against the in-form Dominic Thiem. After two hours on the court, Nadal came out victorious, beating Thiem in straight sets 7–5, 6–3.  Nadal reached the semifinals of the Monte Carlo Rolex Masters for the 2nd straight year after a dominant straight sets win in the quarterfinals against 2015 French Open champion Stan Wawrinka. After dropping the first set in the semifinals 2–6 to world #2 Andy Murray, Nadal rallied to beat Murray 6–4, 6–2, upping his head-to-head record against Murray to 17–6.  In the final, Nadal defeated an in-form Gaël Monfils in three tough sets, winning 7–5, 5–7, 6–0 to claim his 9th Monte Carlo masters trophy, ending a nearly 2-years Masters 1000 title drought since his last Masters title in Madrid 2014. After leading the Masters 1000 title tally for several years Nadal was surpassed by Novak Djokovic in Miami 2016 but the Monte Carlo win ensures that Nadal is again tied with Djokovic for a record of 28 masters titles.

Barcelona Open
After a first round bye, Nadal continued his dominant form by dispatching compatriots Marcel Granollers and Albert Montanes in straight sets to proceed to the Quarterfinals. Nadal faced Fabio Fognini who defeated him 3 times the previous year and managed to close out the match in the 2nd set tiebreak in straight sets. Nadal reaches his 101st final beating German Philipp Kohlschreiber in a one-sided contest, winning in straight sets. He defeated two-time defending champion Kei Nishikori in the final 6–4, 7–5, winning the tournament without dropping a single set and winning a record 9th Barcelona Open and equalling the record of most clay court titles won with Guillermo Vilas with 49 clay court titles.

Madrid Open
After receiving a first round bye, Nadal put on a superb display against Russian Andrey Kuznetsov, beating him in straight sets along with Sam Querrey, dispatching him in a hard-fought straight sets win, nearly going 1–5 down in the first set after fending off a break point in his own serve in the 5th game and then winning 5 straight games to clinch the first set and reach the quarterfinals. Nadal progresses to the semis beating an in-form Joao Sousa in three-sets despite winning the first set in a bagel. He lost to Andy Murray in the semifinal with a score of 7–5, 6–4.

Italian Open
Nadal received an unfavorable draw and, after a bye in the first round, Nadal faced Phillip Kohlschreiber and beat him 6–3, 6–3. Nadal then faced Nick Kyrgios who famously beat Nadal at the 2014 Wimbledon and, despite Kyrgios winning the first set in a tiebreak, Nadal won the last 2 sets, breaking Kyrgios 3 times and winning in three sets to book his place in the quarterfinals, where he was  beaten by Novak Djokovic in straight sets.

French Open

Nadal gained a top 4 seeding for his French Open campaign after Federer withdrew with a back injury which guaranteed he won't be meeting Djokovic until the semifinals. Nadal defeated Sam Groth in the first round 6-1 6-1 6-1. In the second round, Nadal defeated Facundo Bagnis. However, Nadal was forced to withdraw a day before his 3rd round match due to a wrist injury.

US Open Series

Rio Olympics 
Having not played since May 28, Nadal took part in his first competitive match in the Rio Olympic games. Nadal Faced Argentina's Federico Delbonis. Nadal was in no mood to mess around as he put in an excellent performance, winning 6–2 6–1. In the next round, he faced Andreas Seppi, but beat him in straight sets. Nadal faced Gilles Simon from France, and despite hitting 28 unforced errors in the first set, Nadal came through 7-6 6-3. Nadal then faced home favourite and fellow lefty Thomaz Bellucci. Nadal came through in 3 tough sets. He then faced a resurgent Juan Martín del Potro, the pair last met three years ago. Despite Nadal winning the first set, del Potro fought back to claim victory in an epic olympic semi-final. After the loss to del Potro, Rafa faced Kei Nishikori in the bronze medal match. A visibly exhausted Nadal lost the first set 6–2. He was then 5–2 down in the second, but Nishikori nerves were visible, Nadal levelling 7–6. But in the end, Nishikori was too good, prevailing 6–3 in the third.

Nadal saw more success in the doubles tournament playing alongside Marc Lopez, winning the gold medal. Nadal was also set to play in the mixed doubles alongside Garbiñe Muguruza, but withdrew without playing a match, saying the medical staff advised that three tournaments could aggravate his wrist's recovery.

Cincinnati Masters 
Nadal was defeated in the third round by Borna Coric 6-1, 6-3.

US Open 
Entering the tournament as the fourth seed, Nadal advanced to the fourth round but was defeated by 24th seed Lucas Pouille in 5 sets.

Asian Swing

China Open
Nadal defeated Paolo Lorenzi and Adrian Mannarino in straight sets, then lost to Grigor Dimitrov in straight sets in the quarterfinals.

Shanghai Masters
Nadal was defeated in straight sets in his opening round match by Victor Troicki.  This was Nadal's final match of the 2016 season.

All matches

Singles matches

Doubles matches

Mixed doubles matches

Exhibition matches

Tournament schedule

Singles schedule
Nadal's 2016 singles tournament schedule is as follows:
(Bolded letter indicates better or same result at the tournament)

1 The symbol (i) = indoors means that the respective tournament will be held indoors.

2 The ATP numbers between brackets = non-countable tournaments.

Yearly records

Head-to-head matchups
Rafael Nadal has a  match win–loss record in the 2016 season. The following list is ordered by number of wins:
(Bolded number marks a top 10 player at the time of match, Italic means top 30)

Finals

Singles: 3 (2–1)

Doubles: 2 (2–0)

Earnings
Bold font denotes tournament win

See also
 2016 ATP World Tour
 2016 Novak Djokovic tennis season
 2016 Roger Federer tennis season
 2016 Andy Murray tennis season
 2016 Stan Wawrinka tennis season

References

External links 
 
ATP tour profile

2016 Rafael Nadal tennis season
Nadal
Nadal tennis season
Tennis players at the 2016 Summer Olympics